Gareth Clayton (3 February 1942 – 1 July 2010) was an Australian politician. Born in Hampshire, England, he was educated at Liverpool University, and at Makerere University in Uganda. He became a teacher and a scientific officer for the Australian Road Research Board. In 1974, Clayton was elected to the Australian House of Representatives as the Labor member for Isaacs, defeating sitting Liberal MP David Hamer. He in turn was defeated by Hamer in 1975.

References

Australian Labor Party members of the Parliament of Australia
Members of the Australian House of Representatives for Isaacs
Members of the Australian House of Representatives
1942 births
2010 deaths
Alumni of the University of Liverpool
Makerere University alumni
British emigrants to Australia
Australian schoolteachers
20th-century Australian politicians